Énergir, formerly known as Gaz Métro, is an energy company with 520,000 customers in Quebec and the northeastern United States. It is the largest natural gas distribution company in Quebec, and, through subsidiaries, also produces electricity from wind. In the United States the company operates through subsidiaries in nearly fifteen states, where it produces electricity from hydroelectric, wind and solar sources, in addition to being the leading electricity distributor and the sole natural gas distributor in Vermont.

Background
The main natural gas distributor in Québec was created during the first nationalization of electricity in Québec, in 1944. By bringing Montreal Light, Heat and Power under state control, the new Quebec Hydroelectric Commission, better known as Hydro-Québec, not only took charge of the company's electricity assets, and also acquired a gas distribution network in Greater Montreal.

Near the end of the 1940s, industrialists began planning the construction of a pipeline that would connect Alberta and the large cities of Ontario. Hydro-Québec was approached to extend the pipeline toward Montreal. Several meetings were organized, and the Quebec Hydroelectric Commission ordered internal studies and sought expert advice. In March 1954, the commissioners formed a committee to make a decision. The committee recommended replacing industrial gas with natural gas from Western Canada, a conversion that would be of some benefit to the public utility. The commission's president, L.-Eugène Potvin, instead recommended selling the gas sector to a private company. This solution was adopted and the Commission adopted a resolution to divest itself of all its gas assets, which was approved by the Duplessis government. Negotiations began with several groups and the sale of the network to the Quebec Natural Gas Corporation was concluded in the spring of 1957.

In 1969, the company was renamed Gaz Métropolitain. Its liquefaction plant was inaugurated on October 7, 1969.

In 1985, the company acquired Gaz Inter-Cité Québec (which served eastern Québec) and Gaz Provincial du Nord (which served Abitibi-Témiscamingue). It became a subsidiary of Noverco.

In 1986, Gaz Métro acquired Vermont Gas Systems, which distributes all the natural gas in Vermont.

On January 1, 1997, almost 40 years after removing itself from the natural gas sector, Hydro-Québec returned to the sector by acquiring a 42% stake in Noverco, the holding company that controls Gaz Métro. As such, Hydro-Québec was once again under the control of André Caillé, who left the position of President and CEO three months later to become the head of the Québec state company. This move was part of Mr. Caillé's convergence strategy to transform Québec into an energy hub in the northeastern part of the North American continent.

In 2003, Gaz Metropolitain was abridged to Gaz Métro and accompanied by a new logo.

In 2004, Hydro-Québec sold its shares of Noverco to the Caisse de dépôt et placement du Québec. Trencap thus became the majority shareholder in Gaz Métro.

In 2007, Gaz Métro acquired Green Mountain Power, which distributes 70% of the electricity in Vermont. That same year, Sophie Brochu became president and chief executive officer of Gaz Métro.

In 2010, Gaz Métro was restructured so that 71% of its capital was held by the private company Noverco, which was controlled by Trencap (61.11%) and Enbridge (38.9%), while 29% was owned by the new company Valener, listed on the TSX.

In July 2011, ahead of Fortis, Gaz Métro acquired Central Vermont Public Service Corp., "the largest electricity supplier in Vermont," for US$472 million.

CVPS operations were merged with those of GMP in 2012–making GMP the largest electric utility in the state, providing electricity to over 75 percent of Vermont residents.

On November 29, 2017, Gaz Métro was renamed Énergir to reflect its wider energy portfolio.

Financial information 
Énergir is a privately held limited partnership. The largest owner (with 43% ownership) is Trencap, an investment company majority owned by Caisse de dépôt et placement du Québec. Valener, a public energy company, holds an economic interest of about 29% in Énergir (which is its principal asset), and Enbridge, a public pipeline company, owns the remaining 28%.

As at September 30, 2017, Énergir had more than $7 billion in assets.

Activities

Natural gas

Natural gas distribution 
Énergir distributes approximately 97% of the gas consumed in Québec. It serves over 50,000 customers.

Liquefied natural gas (LNG) 
Over the last few years, Gaz Métro has developed its liquefied natural gas (LNG) subsidiary for heavy and maritime transportation, and for serving industries in regions far from the natural gas network. LNG comes from Gaz Métro's liquefaction, storage and regasification (LSR) plant in Montréal East, in operation since 1969.

In 2014, the Québec government (through Investissement Québec) and Gaz Métro teamed up to increase accessibility to liquefied natural gas, starting in 2017, by increasing the capacities of Énergir's natural gas liquefaction plant. The addition of a second liquefaction train will increase production from 3 billion to 9 billion cubic feet per year.

Compressed natural gas (CNG) 
Compressed natural gas (CNG) has exactly the same properties as natural gas in its gaseous state. However, it can be stored at 300 times atmospheric pressure, which reduces the volume by an equal amount. Transported in high pressure tanks, it is mostly used for short-range daily trips.

Biomethane (renewable natural gas) 
Biomethane is a renewable and carbon-neutral energy with the same properties as regular natural gas, and it is produced from organic material. Saint-Hyacinthe became the first municipality in Québec to produce energy through biomethanation, and several projects are now being developed elsewhere in the province of Quebec.

Electricity

United States 
Green Mountain Power (GMP), a subsidiary of Énergir, is the largest electricity distributor in Vermont, serving over 70% of the market and near 265,000 customers. GMP's core business includes the distribution, transportation, generation, purchase and sale of electricity in Vermont and, to a lesser degree, electricity transportation in New Hampshire and electricity generation in the states of New York, Maine and Connecticut.

Green Mountain Power generates a portion of the electricity it distributes but most of its supply is purchased from other producers. Its supply portfolio comprises several sources of power generation, including wind power, solar power and hydroelectricity. GMP also buys electricity produced with "cow power," a process that uses methane from the manure of dairy cattle to generate clean energy.

In March 2017, Énergir announced the acquisition, through one of its subsidiaries, of Standard Solar, Inc. a leading solar energy firm specializing in the development and installation of commercial solar electric systems in many states across the United States. Based in Rockville, Maryland, Standard Solar is a commercial, industrial and institutional solar developer, engineering, procurement and construction management, as well as operations and maintenance services provider operating in multiple states in the United States.

Québec  
The Seigneurie de Beaupré Wind Farms are an equal-share joint venture of Boralex and Beaupré Éole, which is, in turn, 51%-owned by Gaz Métro and 49%-owned by Valener. The core business of this joint venture consists in owning and operating these wind farms. The first phase includes two wind farms with an installed capacity of 272 megawatts. These wind farms were put into commercial service in the first quarter of fiscal 2014. The second phase has an installed capacity of 68 megawatts and was put into commercial service on December 1, 2014.

All of the electricity generated is sold to Hydro-Québec under a 20-year contract.

Footnotes

External links
 Énergir
 Vermont Gas
 Green Mountain Power
 Northern New England Energy

Natural gas companies of Canada
Natural gas pipeline companies
Companies based in Montreal
Energy companies established in 1957
1957 establishments in Quebec
Canadian companies established in 1957